Aleksandar Kršić (born 6 May 1991) is a Serbian football defender who plays for OFK Odžaci, on loan from in the ČSK Pivara.

References

External links
 
 Aleksandar Kršić stats at utakmica.rs 
 

1991 births
Living people
Footballers from Osijek
Serbs of Croatia
Association football defenders
Serbian footballers
FK Hajduk Kula players
FK ČSK Čelarevo players
Serbian SuperLiga players